Anna Magnusson (born 1 January 1995) is a Swedish professional golfer who plays on the Ladies European Tour.

Early life and amateur career
Magnusson was born in Stockholm in 1995. She started to play golf when she was nine years old, and as a teenager won five tournaments on the Skandia Tour and two on the Junior Masters Invitational junior circuits in Sweden.

She attended Morehead State University 2013–2017 and played golf with the Morehead State Eagles women's golf team in the Ohio Valley Conference (OVC). She was a four-time All-OVC First Team selection and four-time medalist. She was named Miss Eagle both as a junior and a senior, the first women's golfer to be named Miss Eagle for a second straight year.

Professional career
Magnusson turned professional after she graduated in 2017 and joined the Swedish Golf Tour midway through the 2017 season. In 2018, she recorded two wins, a playoff victory against Malene Krølbøll Hansen in June and a two-stroke victory over Karoline Stormo and Filippa Möörk in July. 

She joined the LET Access Series in 2019, where she recorded top-5 finishes at the Santander Golf Tour Lerma and Santander Golf Tour Lauro in 2020.

Magnusson played on the Ladies European Tour in 2021 but struggled to make an impact outside the Aramco Team Series events, where she finished tied fifth in London with Nicole Garcia and Christine Wolf. In 2022 she played on the LET Access Series where she had a consistent season with third places at the Flumserberg Ladies Open and Göteborg Ladies Open, and five further top-10 finishes. She clinched the sixth and final spot on the LETAS Order of Merit to secure an LET card for 2023.

Amateur wins
2009 Skandia Tour Distrikt SGDF Nord #1, Skandia Tour Distrikt SGDF Final 
2010 Skandia Tour SGDF Södra #2
2011 Skandia Tour Regional #3 - Stockholm Norra	
2012 Alex Norén Junior Open, Huvudstaden Junior Open, Skandia Tour Riks #1 - Skåne
2015 Bluegrass Fall Kickoff
2016 Matador Invitational, Golfweek Program Challenge, Lady Pirate Intercollegiate

Sources:

Professional wins (3)

Swedish Golf Tour wins (1)

Other wins (1)
2020 Stockholm District Championship (SGF Golf Ranking)

References

External links

Swedish female golfers
Ladies European Tour golfers
Morehead State Eagles women's golfers
Golfers from Stockholm
1995 births
Living people
21st-century Swedish women